Burgos, officially the Municipality of Burgos, is a 4th class municipality in the province of Pangasinan, Philippines. According to the 2020 census, it has a population of 23,749 people.

On the western part of Pangasinan, along the coast of the China Sea lies a town called - Burgos, perched on a broad plateau.

Burgos was founded as an independent town in 1830 by the early Ilocanos from Paoay, Ilocos Norte headed by Don Matias Guiang.  As the settlement grew thickly populated and extensive, Don Matias Guiang led a petition to the Governor of Zambales to create a new town out of the settlement.  The request was granted and the new town was named San Isidro which was finally renamed Burgos, after the Filipino martyr priest who was executed during the Spanish regime.

The town of Burgos was ceded to the Province of Pangasinan by virtue of Public Act No. 1004 dated November 30, 1903 of the Philippine
Commission.

Etymology
Burgos was originally named San Isidro in honor of its patron saint. Since there was another locality named San Isidro along Lingayen Gulf, the residents added "Potot " to the town's name. This term is an Ilocano adjective meaning "clipped", "cut-off" or "disconnected", referring to the Amburayan River which during dry season doesn't have continuous water. This stream, therefore, is discontinued and disconnected during summer months. Confusion however continued and persisted as mail for San Isidro de Potot  was erroneously sent to the town of San Isidro Labrador and those of the latter to the former town.

To resolve the confusion, Mayor Don Anacleto Ruiz changed the town's name to Burgos in 1913, in memory of Filipino martyr Padre José Apolonio Burgos, who together with Padre Gomez and Zamora were executed in the field of Bagumbayan on February 17, 1872.

History

Spanish period
In the first part of the 19th century, Matías Guiang, a mighty sailor-explorer from the town of Paoay, Ilocos Norte, regularly traveled the China Sea between the Ilocos and Zambales regions for the purpose of trade. Attracted to its agricultural possibilities, Matías Guiang along with his family, friends and neighbors eventually migrated to Zambales del Norte, now the westernmost part of the province of Pangasinan. They disembarked at the mouth of the Agno River by tracing it.

They found a settlement in the eastern part of the present town proper. The provincial government of Zambales has not ignored the ever increasing population of San Isidro and as it saw the necessity of a government to oversee the village. Don Matías Guiang made history, as quoted from the Philippine Archives, when on May 15, 1830, the Spanish Governor of Iba, Zambales issued a decree creating the settlement into a pueblo and appointed Don Matías Guiang, who was then the most wealthy and influential land owner of the place, as the first gobernadorcillo of the town. San Isidro de Potot was its incorporated name in honor of Saint Isidore the Laborer, whom the settlers had adopted, loved and revered as their patron saint.

Philippine Revolution
In the late 19th century, the gobernadorcillo was Don Tomás Braga, and the parish priest of the town during the revolution was Mariano Torrente, a native of Barcelona, Spain. The town was a prosperous community of farming and ranching, but the atmosphere was already seething with dissidence; winds of rebellion disturbed the people.

Twenty Spanish cazadores had their cuartel or barracks in the big house of Don Gaspar Ruiz. Cazadores literally means "hunters" their aim was to hunt the Filipino outlaws or dissidents. Across the plaza from the cuartel was a big convent, made out of adobe stones, 24 meters long and 12 meters wide, and two stories high. Across the plaza from the convent was the tribunal or municipal hall, This tribunal was made out of stones, ten meters high. A tower was being constructed at the town plaza between the convent and the tribunal. This tower or fort was made of stones, 5 meters square inside dimensions, 3 stories high, and its walls are 1/2 meter thick.

As insurgency was becoming widespread; the Spaniards adopted measures that increased the number of outlaws. In Northern Zambales (now Western Pangasinan), the leader of the insurgency was Roman Manalang whose headquarters was in a hideout somewhere in Alaminos, while in San Isidro, the captain of the outlaws was Juanso Viado. The outlaws or dissidents, while numerous, had very few defective guns, and mostly armed with crude sabers, sharp spears and long bolos.

In February 1898, the outlaws attacked the cuartel of the Spanish forces in the big house of Don Gaspar Ruiz. The attackers greatly outnumbered the Spaniards, who managed to escape to the big convent across the plaza. The Filipino attackers laid a siege to them, but the Spaniards were able to escape again, now they entrenched themselves deeply to the tower at the middle of the plaza. The people of the town including the gobernadorcillo and the principales gone to distant the place.

After a siege of two nights and three days, the Spanish forces threw their guns out of the windows of the tower as surrender, mediated by Fr. Mariano Torrente.

The morning following the surrender, news reached San Isidro that a big Spanish troop, heavily armed had arrived in Alaminos and were on their way to San Isidro, to save the Spaniards. To prevent the escape, they were taken to the forest of Alimpayukan between San Isidro and Balincaguin (now Mabini), where in the forest, Alimpayukan, the Spanish cazadores and civiles and including Fr. Torrente and also Fr. Navas of Dasol were blindfolded and their heads cut-off.

Shortly after the Spaniards were murdered, the big Spanish troop arrived in San Isidro and encircled the town. There were 20 uniformed Filipino outlaws or insurgents who were to form a local government. These were caught, taken to Mt. Polipol just a few kilometers east from the town, and were shot in a single file. The Spanish troop burned down the big houses that were owned by the richest and the most influential people of the town.

Because the Spanish priest of Dasol, Fr. Juan Navas, was beheaded in the forest of Alimpayukan and many of the insurgents were from Dasol, the big Spanish troop proceeded to Dasol, where they killed the principales and captains, that is, the rich and the influential, and also burned their big houses.

On March 7, 1898, the small Spanish detachments in the northern towns of Zambales were defeated and around fifty Spanish friars were killed. These were the parish priests of Anda, Balincaguin, Bani, Bolinao, Dasol and San Isidro de Potot.

When the Spanish troop had left, the insurgents returned and established a local Katipunan Government.

American Occupation
The Katipunan Government was functioning smoothly, at least in San Isidro. In November 1900, Gen. Miguel and Don Miguel and Don Mauro Ortiz came to recruit volunteers to fight the Americans in Mangatarem. The volunteers went to Mangatarem, but poorly armed, had to retreat before the heavily armed Americans. They went back across the mountains to Mt. Pita, then went to Infanta, and then back to San Isidro.

The Americans occupied San Isidro by December 1900 and established peace and order through a policy of attraction. They gave clothes, free goods and tolerated the local customs. American styles of dress influenced the changing of Filipino costumes from oriental to occidental.

In 1901 a severe storm hit San Isidro, destroying the big convent and the municipal building.

In 1903, the northern part of Zambales was annexed to the Province of Pangasinan. The municipalities ceded were Alaminos, Bolinao, Anda, Bani, Agno, Infanta and San Isidro de Potot. The municipality of San Isidro at that time included Balincaguin and Dasol.

Shortly after the towns of Northern Zambales were incorporated to Pangasinan. Balincaguin (1908) and Dasol (1911) seceded from San Isidro de Potot. Balincaguin was renamed as Mabini (in honor of Apolinario Mabini), and San Isidro de Potot  was changed to Burgos (in honor of José Burgos) in 1913.

World War II
During the Japanese Occupation in the years 1941–1945, the Japanese soldiers did not much disturbed the barrios of the town, due to Japanese high command to give compulsory contribution of rice and bamboos for their garrison.

Geography
Burgos is in the western part of Pangasinan situated on a broad plateau at the edge of the Zambales mountain ranges. It also holds the westernmost point in Luzon.

Barangays

Burgos is politically subdivided into 14 barangays. These barangays are headed by elected officials: Barangay Captain, Barangay Council, whose members are called Barangay Councilors. All are elected every three years.
 Anapao (Bur Anapac)
 Cacayasen
 Concordia
 Ilio-ilio (Iliw-iliw)
 Papallasen
Poblacion
 Pogoruac
 Don Matias
 San Miguel
 San Pascual
 San Vicente
 Sapa Grande
 Sapa Pequeña
 Tambacan

Climate

Demographics

Economy

Government
Burgos, belonging to the first congressional district of the province of Pangasinan, is governed by a mayor designated as its local chief executive and by a municipal council as its legislative body in accordance with the Local Government Code. The mayor, vice mayor, and the councilors are elected directly by the people through an election which is being held every three years.

Elected officials

List of Municipal Heads
The name of persons who held a leading official position during the Spanish period and thereafter were the following.

Gobernadorcillo:

Don Matias Guiang (1830)
Don Pascual Bonostro (1831)
Don Diego Bustamante (1832)
Don Fernando Bonilla (1833)
Don Paulo Padua (1834)
Don Matias Guiang (1835)
Don Juan Discoloso (1836)
Don Juan Bonostro (1837)
Don Agustin Cuaresma (1838)
Don Pascual de Guzman (1839)
Don Paulo Doctor (1840)
Don Pedro Guiang (1841)
Don Vicente Bondal (1842)
Don Miguel Cuaresma (1843)
Don Ramon Bustria (1844)
Don Exequel Ugto (1845)
Don Agapito Tolentino Braga (1846)
Don Domingo Valdez (1847)
Don Tomas Guiang (1848)
Don Jose de Leon (1849)
Don Juan Bonilla (1850)
Don Henenio Doctor (1851)
Don Raymundo Bonostro (1852)
Don Romualdo Braga (1853)
Don Melchor Ruiz (1854)
Don Paulino Bustamante (1855)
Don Feliciano de Guzman (1856)
Don Eldefonzo Bona (1857)
Don Cornelio Valdez (1858)
Don Agapito Ugto (1859)
Don Martin Gallardo (1860)
Don Mariano Mendoza (1861)
Don Anborcio Guiang (1862)
Don Santiago Ruiz (1863–1865)
Don Justo Bonado (1865–1867)
Don Victorio Braga (1867–1869)
Don Mauricio Gallardo (1869–1871)
Don Silvestro Ruiz (1871–1873)
Don Cornelio Braga (1873–1875)
Don Flaviano Cudal (1875–1877)
Don Francisco Guiang (1877–1879)
Don Lorenzo Bonado (1879–1881)
Don Raymundo Boricano (1881–1883)
Don Simon Ruiz (1883–1885)
Don Simon Guiang (1885–1887)
Don Vinancio Gallardo (1887–1889)
Don Pablo Boricano (1889–1891)
Don Lauriano Kadarang (1891-1893)
Don Luiz Bonilla (1893–1895)
Don Tomas Braga (1895–1898)

Presidents during the Revolution

Don Mauricio Gallardo (1898–1900)
Don Vicente Mendoza
Don Tomas Braga (1900–1901)
Don Carlos Ruiz (1901–1902)

Civil Government (Municipal Presidents)

Don Paulino Mendoza (1904–1905)
Don Francisco Bustamante (1906–1907)
Don Jacinto Braga (1908–1911)
Don Nicolas Guiang (1911–1912)
Don Anacleto Ruiz (1912–1916)
Don Juan Bonado (1916–1919)
Don Matias Ruiz (1919–1922)
Don Agustin R. Braga (1922)
Don Nazario Bonilla (1925–1928)
Don Matias Bustamante (1928–1931)
Don Melquiades Ruiz (1931–1934)
Don Lorenzo Bonado (1934–1943)

Municipal Mayors

Don Jacinto R. Braga (1907-1911)
Don Nazario Bonilla (1925-1928)
Hon. Melquiades D. Ruiz (1931-1934)
Don Matias Bustamante (1928-1931)
Don Lorenzo Bonado Y. Braga (1934)
Don Severino Rayos (1948)
Don Andres Ramos (1949–1951)
Don Antonio Bonilla (1952-1956)
Dr. Alberto G. Guiang Sr. (1956-1959)
Hon. Pedro D. Ruiz (1960-1967)
Hon. Emilio G. Ermitano M.D (1968-1971)
Don Victorino B. Braga (1972-1980)
Don Demetrio N. Cabiles (1980-1986) & (1988-1992)
OIC Dr. Alberto R. Guiang Jr. (July 1, 1986 – November 30, 1986)
Dr. Alberto G. Guiang, Sr. (1992-1995)
Dr. Alberto G. Guiang, Jr. (1995-2001)
Atty. Domingo A Doctor, Jr (2001-2010)
Dr. Albert G. Guiang, Jr. (2010-2019)
Dr. Ronald G. Ngayawan (2019–2022)
Hon. Jesster Allan B. Valenzuela (2022–present)

Tourism

The town of Burgos is home of some natural wonders like white-sand beaches and falls:
Cabongaoan White Sand Beach: Cabongaoan Beach has a long stretch of sugary white sand that turns golden when the sun is out. Cabongaoan Beach has another feature that makes it a cut above the rest of Pangasinan's beaches, the so-called "Depth Pool." This tidal pool on the rocky side of the beach gets filled with water when the waves crash against it. It was featured in the national television show Kapuso Mo, Jessica Soho and Biyahe ni Drew.
Sangbay Falls: Located in Barangay San Vicente. It can b challenging for some to get there because of the good 30-minute walk from the main road but the rewards at the other end are well worth the effort.
Rolling Hills: Other natural attractions in Burgos include the rolling hills in southbound barangays of Sapa Pequeña, Sapa Grande, Concordia, Pogoruac, and Ilio-Ilio where herds of cattle in ranches roam freely.
Danao Lake: Located in Barangay Cacayasen.
Pao Beach/Nambalan Cove: Located in Barangay Ilio-ilio.
Paratec Beach: Located in Barangay Ilio-ilio.
Batog Beach: Located in Barangay Ilio-ilio.
Nambalan Cove: Located in Barangay Ilio-Ilio
Bayog Festival (May)

Saint Isidore The Farmer Parish Church

In 1876, the Dominicans created the Parish church of St. Isidore, the patron saint of farmers, seeing that the town's chief industry was farming. The patron's feast is annually celebrated on May 15. It is also the town fiesta.

It was the founding missionaries who built the present façade of the church, made mostly of quarried adobe stones contributed by the faithful. The Dominicans left during the American regime and were succeeded by Filipino clergymen who continued the improvement of the house of God and the ministration of the faithful. The church edifice, made mostly of quarried adobe stones and rough-hewn lumber, was built through many years.

See also
List of renamed cities and municipalities of the Philippines

References

External links

 Burgos Profile at PhilAtlas.com
  Municipal Profile at the National Competitiveness Council of the Philippines
 Burgos at the Pangasinan Government Website
 Local Governance Performance Management System
 [ Philippine Standard Geographic Code]
 Philippine Census Information

Municipalities of Pangasinan
1830 establishments in the Philippines